John McGough (born 1966) is a musician and entertainer based in Auckland, New Zealand.

He was introduced to the trumpet at the age of nine and began taking lessons from the then New Zealand National Cornet Champion Vaughan McDonald. When Vaughan was selected to undertake an extensive tour of North America with the 1978 National Band of New Zealand, McGough then took lessons from Vaughan's teacher, cornet virtuoso and Musical Director of the World Champion Continental Airlines Auckland Brass Errol Mason. Errol was a world class cornet player and musical director of New Zealand's most famous brass band. Continental Airlines Auckland Brass were household names. They were the highlight of any pre entertainment All Black test at the time at Eden Park Auckland.    

When the Continental Airlines Brass Band was booked to play at the inaugural Rugby World Cup at Eden Park in 1987, McGough was invited to play solo, and concluded the international telecast with "Now Is The Hour" before an estimated international television audience of 300 million people.

During his time with the World Champion Continental Airlines Auckland Brass, McGough served as their MC. He also branched out playing for well known Auckland soul bands the 7 Deadly Sins, Rick Bryant and the Jive Bombers and was called upon to assist the popular Auckland big band the Queen City Big Band. In 1986 the newly formed Queen City Big Band where finalists along with McGough, who was a solo entertainer, for the title of New Zealand's "Rising Star of the Year" which was won that year by young singing sensation Annie Crummer. 

At age 16, McGough was recruited as the support act for the current New Zealand entertainer of the year at that time, known as the "Voice of New Zealand" Rhonda Bryers. Bryers soon moved to Hawaii to perform and McGough then starred in Old Time Music Halls with well known New Zealand entertainers Derek Metzger, Chic Littlewood, Doug Aston, Louise Malloy, Keith Leggett and many others.

McGough has been a member of eleven New Zealand champion bands and two Australian champion bands. He now plays freelance for brass bands and has toured with bands such as the Waitakere Auckland Brass and the Dalewool Auckland Brass. He has inspired young musicians from the Marlborough District Brass in Blenheim for over 10 years and is now registered with the NBS Nelson City Brass. 

McGough was first selected for the National Band of New Zealand in 1990 and appeared with them at the 1990 Commonwealth Games. He was selected for the 1992 tour of New Zealand and hosted their New Zealand tour in 2003. In 2009 he was selected as a player again to travel with them to the World Championships in Kerkrade, the Netherlands.

McGough has also been employed for his Master of Ceremony skills at many events. Hosting brass band and ballet performances. Voiced radio commercials, entertainment and theatre awards and corporate product launches.    

He has received a number of prestigious awards from the Variety Artists Club of New Zealand including a Scroll of Honour in 1998 for his achievements within the New Zealand entertainment industry, the 2012 Agnew Award for Excellence in the New Zealand entertainment industry and the 2016 Top Musician Award.

McGough has won two New Zealand solo titles on both Cornet and Flugelhorn. He also received a podium finish  in the prestigious Champion of Champions event at the New Zealand National Championships when competing as a soloist in 1989.  

McGough has performed in many countries including a full New Zealand tour, Fiji, Vanuatu, Samoa, China, Vietnam, New York, and has been guest soloist with bands in England, Australia and Saipan.

He has appeared on many New Zealand television shows such as Stars on Sunday, Hui Pacific, Variety Street, NZ Today, 5:30 Live, Good Morning, Chat Bungalow, Seven Sharp, The AM Show and Rockin' the Planet on various New Zealand television channels. 

December 2020 John was invited to become an ambassador to the CarolBrass range of musical instruments and is proud to be performing with the CarolBrass Euro Trumpet, their Dizzy Pocket Trumpet as well as the Tailor Phat Puppy Compact Flugel Horn, also manufactured by CarolBrass. 

McGough has served as adjudicator at New Zealand, Auckland, Central District and Waikato/BOP brass band contests.

He has released an album, Two Shades of Brass. Available for purchase on iTunes, Spotify and Google Play. The album is also available on board all Air New Zealand international flights on their inflight entertainment menu. In 2016 McGough was again selected for the National Band of New Zealand competing at the 2017 World Championships in Kerkrade, the Netherlands, where they were awarded 2nd place. 

In February 2022 John released his very first original composition written for him by the late Frank Beaumont. He named it "Ruze Vida". The track is on his latest album Doin' What I Do, which has also been included on Air New Zealands in flight entertainment.

Major awards

 2016 : Top Musician, Variety Artists Club of New Zealand
 2012 : Agnew Award for Excellence, Variety Artists Club of New Zealand
 1998 : Scroll of Honour, Variety Artists Club of New Zealand
 2002–2004 : Best Compere, NZ Band Competitions
 1989 : New Zealand Flugelhorn Champion
 1983 : New Zealand Junior Cornet Champion

References

External links
 John McGough Trumpetguy Official Website
 National Band of New Zealand Official Website
 
 
 
 
 
https://www.youtube.com/watch?v=O9-mcUyfMnU
https://www.youtube.com/watch?v=g2KIAJI52lI
https://www.youtube.com/watch?v=OOQ4Ac5F9-w
https://www.youtube.com/watch?v=XfzubDrJlBc
https://www.youtube.com/watch?v=2mE3bAmKySU
https://www.youtube.com/watch?v=Cx7z0vIDSVs
https://www.youtube.com/watch?v=L2sRbsFSUSY
https://www.youtube.com/watch?v=Ded4TlVYH4o
https://www.youtube.com/watch?v=UnGxgMk1wc8
https://www.youtube.com/watch?v=BRUHf7daCyI
https://www.youtube.com/watch?v=K_Lf7FAdUvM
https://www.youtube.com/watch?v=OOQ4Ac5F9-w

People from Auckland
Living people
1966 births
New Zealand musicians